Richard Fox may refer to:

Politicians
 Richard Fox (died 1435), member of the UK parliament for Shropshire
 Richard Maxwell Fox (fl. 1847–1852), member of the UK parliament for Longford
 Richard Kenneth Fox (1925–2017), United States ambassador to Trinidad and Tobago

Sports
 Richard Fox (canoeist) (born 1960), British canoe slalom champion
 Richard Fox (coach) (1899–1960), American college basketball and baseball coach
 Richard Fox (jockey) (1954–2011), Irish-born British jockey and body-double

Others
 Richard Fox (chef) (fl. 2008–2010), British chef, broadcaster and writer
 Richard Alan Fox (born 1943), Australian medical physician
 Richard Kyle Fox (1846–1922), owner of the Police Gazette
Richard K. Fox (pilot boat), a 19th-century pilot boat 
 Richard Fox (chronicler) (fl. 1448), lay clerk at the abbey of St Albans, where he served as chamberlain to Abbott John Whethamstede
 R. M. Fox (Richard Michael Fox, 1891–1969), Irish journalist and historian
 Richard Edwin Fox (1956–2003), executed by the state of Ohio for kidnap and murder 
 Richard J. Fox (1927–2020), American property developer, entrepreneur and philanthropist
 Richard L. Fox, American author and attorney

See also
 Richard Foxe (c. 1448–1528), English churchman and founder of Corpus Christi College, Oxford
 Rick Fox (born 1969), Canadian actor and former basketball player